Alpha-tectorin is a protein that in humans is encoded by the TECTA gene.

The tectorial membrane is an apical extracellular matrix (aECM) of the inner ear that contacts the stereocilia bundles of specialized sensory hair cells. Sound induces movement of these hair cells relative to the tectorial membrane, deflects the stereocilia, and leads to fluctuations in hair-cell membrane potential, transducing sound into electrical signals. Alpha-tectorin is one of the major noncollagenous components of the tectorial membrane.  Mutations in the TECTA gene have been shown to be responsible for autosomal dominant nonsyndromic hearing impairment and a recessive form of sensorineural pre-lingual non-syndromic deafness.

References

Further reading

Extracellular matrix proteins